L.D. 50 is the debut studio album by American heavy metal band Mudvayne. Released on  August 22, 2000, it is the band's first release on Epic Records, following the independently-released extended play Kill, I Oughtta. The album was co-produced by Garth Richardson and Mudvayne, and executive produced by Steve Richards and Slipknot member Shawn "Clown" Crahan.

The band's elaborate visual appearance resulted in increased recognition of the band, and L.D. 50 peaked at No. 85 on the Billboard 200. While initially receiving mixed critical reception on release, the album would gain praise from critics over time for its technical and heavy style of music.

Background and production
Mudvayne formed in 1996 in Peoria, Illinois. The band became known for its strong visual appearance, which included horror film-styled makeup. After independently releasing their debut extended play, Kill, I Oughtta, the band signed to No-Name/Epic Records. L.D. 50 was produced by Garth "GGGarth" Richardson and executive produced by Steve Richards and Slipknot member Shawn "Clown" Crahan. Epic Records initially chose to promote the band without focusing on its appearance and early promotional materials featured a logo instead of photographs of the band. However, the band's appearance and music videos increased recognition of the album.

According to the band, the production of the album was very hectic. Drummer Matthew McDonough reflected, "We worked around the clock, and some of the engineers we had with us literally went for days with-out sleep. It was very, very time-intensive. We didn't party. We were recording in Vancouver but didn't get to see the town-we were just there and we worked and that was it. It was very intense, and Garth ran a tight ship." Singer Chad Gray recalled, "Making the record was crazy. It was all about work. There were songs I left alone and didn't mess with until we were in the studio, which was not a smart idea considering the time and budget constraints we were under. I wrote 'Pharmaecopia' and 'Nothing To Gein' on our last night in the studio, before the tapes were sent to New York to be mixed. The pres-sure [sic] was insane."

Music and lyrics

L.D. 50 features a technical style of music which has been referred to by the band as math metal. Mudvayne's musical style has influences of death metal, hardcore punk, jazz fusion, speed metal and hip hop.

Mudvayne has found additional inspiration from artists such as Obituary, Emperor, Mötley Crüe, Alice in Chains, Pearl Jam, King Crimson, Porcupine Tree and Metallica. However, the band has stated that they are not influenced by other metal bands. The album's first track, "Monolith", refers to Stanley Kubrick's film 2001: A Space Odyssey. The band were greatly influenced by this film during the making of L.D. 50.

During the songwriting process, the band members paired riffs with lyrics based on what Matthew McDonough referred to as "number symbolism". According to McDonough, while he and Chad Gray wrote the lyrics to "Nothing to Gein", Greg Tribbett performed a riff which alternated in bars of 4 and 5. Because the number 9 is a lunar number, McDonough felt that the riff would fit the song's lyrics, which referred to serial killer and grave robber Ed Gein, whose actions McDonough associated with nighttime activity. Gein's story grabbed the attention of McDonough and Gray as they were leafing through a book on murderers and true crime. Regarding Gein, McDonough commented, "It seemed so impossible [for Gein] to bridge the gap into mainstream society. I found that exciting that I could find humanity in him".

The album's title derives from the technical term 'Median lethal dose', abbreviated 'LD50', used by toxicologists to refer to the dose required to kill half (50 percent of) the members of a tested population. A sound collage entitled "L.D. 50", composed and recorded by drummer Matthew McDonough, appears on the album as a series of interludes. The complete piece appeared as a bonus track on The Beginning of All Things to End, Epic Records' reissue of the band's 1997 self-released EP Kill, I Oughtta. The album also features distorted audio clips voiced by American philosopher and psychonaut, Terence McKenna, who died around the time of the album's recording.

The musical style of L.D. 50 has been primarily described as heavy metal or one of its subgenres. AllMusic described the album, in addition to heavy metal, as thrash. Exclaim! described the album as nu metal. Spin magazine has described the album as having a "future-prog" sound. The Rough Guide to Heavy Metal described the album's sound as art metal.

Release and commercial performance
L.D. 50 was released on August 22, 2000. It peaked at number one on the Billboard Top Heatseekers chart and number 85 on the Billboard 200. The singles "Dig" and "Death Blooms" peaked at No. 33 and No. 32, respectively, on the Mainstream Rock Tracks chart.

L.D. 50 was repackaged with The Beginning of All Things to End on August 30, 2011. These albums, plus The Beginning of Things to End, a reissue of the band's demo Kill, I Oughtta, were repackaged as part of the Original Album Classics in 2012.

Critical reception

L.D. 50 received mixed to positive reviews from critics. Rolling Stone contributor Ben Ratliff gave the album three out of five stars. He noted the band's technical background, comparing the songwriting style to that of Nirvana and stating that the album's interludes are better than those of Slipknot. Blabbermouth.net writer Borivoj Krgin praised its technicality and heaviness.

AllMusic described the music as "hard to take seriously", noting that "the CD booklet, which contains an acknowledgments section as lengthy and gushy as what you'd find on a teen pop album. Can these guys giving thanks and love to family and friends be the same ones performing aggressive lockstep metal, spewing obscenities, and singing about suicide?" Exclaim! gave the album a negative review, stating that "Despite titles like 'Internal Primates Forever,' '-1,' 'Nothing To Gein,' 'Pharmaecopia' and '(K)Now F(orever)' nothing can improve this pathetic nu-metal drivel" and "The only redeeming quality to this record is the intrusive fretless bass sound that kind of sounds like Les Claypool's noodling." NME gave the album a negative review, describing the album as "An unholy stew, baby, a musical ebola" and that there were "far too many incidences of Rush-style mid-'70s ponce metal 'proper' singing. Think Yes. Think 'Stonehenge' by Spinal Tap. Think prog-rock bollocks, baby!" Revolver put the album on their list 10 Nu-Metal Albums You Need to Own, stating that "the album's prog-rock experimentalism and virtuosic playing hold up amazingly well–even if the rapping on tracks like "Under My Skin" binds 'L.D. 50′ more to nu-metal than to the math-metal tag".

In 2020, it was named one of the 20 best metal albums of 2000 by Metal Hammer magazine.

Track listing

Personnel
Mudvayne
Chad Gray – lead vocals
Greg Tribbett – guitars, backing vocals
Ryan Martinie – bass
Matthew McDonough – drums, keyboards

Additional personnel
 Garth Richardson – producer, audio production
 Dean Maher – engineer
 Steve Richards – executive producer
 M. Shawn Crahan – executive producer
 Steve Sisco – assistant engineer
 Scott Ternan – assistant engineer
 Andre Wahl – audio engineer
Andy Wallace – mixing at Soundtrack Studios, New York City
 Howie Weinberg – mastering at Masterdisk, New York City

Charts

Weekly charts

Singles

Certifications

References

2000 debut albums
Albums produced by Garth Richardson
Albums recorded at The Warehouse Studio
Epic Records albums
Mudvayne albums